Juan Pablo Andrade Moya (born 29 November 1988) is a Chilean footballer who plays for Rangers in the Primera B de Chile.

He has previously played in Primera División and Primera B for Unión San Felipe, Barnechea and Universidad de Concepción. In January 2022, Andrade signed with Rangers de Talca.

References

External links
 
 Juan Pablo Andrade at playmakerstats.com (English version of ceroacero.es)

1988 births
Living people
Chilean footballers
Unión San Felipe footballers
A.C. Barnechea footballers
Independiente de Cauquenes footballers
Segunda División Profesional de Chile players
Chilean Primera División players
Primera B de Chile players
Association football defenders
People from Curicó Province